Schrebera kusnotoi is a plant in the family Oleaceae. The flowers are white. Habitat is forests from sea level to  altitude. S. kusnotoi is endemic to Borneo.

References

kusnotoi
Endemic flora of Borneo
Trees of Borneo
Plants described in 1953